Edit Molnár (born 12 September 1965) is a Hungarian sprinter. She competed in the women's 4 × 400 metres relay at the 1992 Summer Olympics.

References

External links
 

1965 births
Living people
Athletes (track and field) at the 1992 Summer Olympics
Hungarian female sprinters
Olympic athletes of Hungary
People from Sajószentpéter
Olympic female sprinters
Sportspeople from Borsod-Abaúj-Zemplén County